Chen Xiaojia (born 2 April 1988) is a Chinese basketball player for Jiangsu Phoenix and the Chinese national team, where she participated at the 2014 FIBA World Championship.

References

External links 
 
 
 
 

1988 births
Living people
Chinese women's basketball players
Guards (basketball)
Basketball players at the 2016 Summer Olympics
Olympic basketball players of China
Basketball players from Jiangsu
Sportspeople from Wuxi
Jiangsu Phoenix players